Miguel Alejandro Sanhueza Mora (born 30 August 1991) is a Chilean footballer currently playing for Deportes Iquique on loan from Coquimbo Unido.

Career
For the 2023 season, he signed with Coquimbo Unido in the Chilean Primera División, being loaned to Deportes Iquique.

Personal life
He is the older brother of the also footballer Eryin Sanhueza.

References

External links
 
 

1991 births
Living people
People from Temuco
Chilean footballers
Cobreloa footballers
Deportes Melipilla footballers
Santiago Wanderers footballers
Coquimbo Unido footballers
Deportes Iquique footballers
Chilean Primera División players
Primera B de Chile players
Segunda División Profesional de Chile players
Association football defenders